Laurențiu Dumitru Roșu (born 26 October 1975) is a Romanian retired footballer who played as either a forward or winger, and is a manager.

After four seasons at Steaua București, he spent nine years as a professional in Spain – eight in the two major divisions, where he amassed totals of 222 games and 45 goals – representing three clubs, mostly Numancia and Recreativo.

Roșu earned nearly 40 caps for Romania, representing the nation at Euro 2000.

Club career
Born in Iaşi, Roșu started playing football with local FC Politehnica. Not yet 18, he moved to country giants FC Steaua București where he would spend the following seven years, winning five Liga I championships.

In his first season, Roșu only featured in four league matches, but after his direct competitor was sold he blossomed into a top-flight player, scoring six goals in 31 games in the 1994–95 campaign and adding a combined 27 in his last two as the team finished third on both occasions. Previously, in 1997–98, as Steaua again lifted the league trophy (with three goals from the player), it became the first club in the country after World War II to conquer the national title for six consecutive years.

With Roșu on board, Steaua became the first Romanian side to reach the UEFA Champions League group stage phase, in the 1994–95 edition, and he left in 2000 with 159 matches played in the first division, all with the same team. He also won three Romanian Cups, adding 43 appearances and four goals in European competition.

Roșu moved to CD Numancia for 2000–01, joining compatriot Constantin Barbu who had arrived the previous season. In his first year in Spain he scored eight times– including a hat-trick against Real Madrid– but the Sorians were relegated from La Liga. After a further three years, all in the second level, he signed for Recreativo de Huelva, scoring 19 goals in his first two seasons including ten in 2005–06 as the Andalusians returned to the top division after a three-year absence.

After managing to score only three times in 2006–07 and appear in four matches in the following season, Roșu moved to neighbours Cádiz CF, recently relegated to the third level. He was released after a sole campaign, having contributed sparingly to their immediate promotion.

On 25 March 2008, Roșu was decorated by the president of Romania, Traian Băsescu, for having qualified to Euro 2008 with "Medalia Meritul Sportiv" – (the "Sportive Merit" medal) class III. He started a managerial career in 2010, notably working as an assistant with FC Vaslui and FC Petrolul Ploiești.

For 2016–17, Roșu was appointed head coach of Liga II's FC UTA Arad. The following season, he was in charge of CS Mioveni of the same league.

International career
Roșu made his debut for the Romania national team on 10 October 1998 against Portugal, in an UEFA Euro 2000 qualifier (1–0 away win), and represented his country at the tournament's final stages. He went on to play 38 internationals and score five goals, including one against Bulgaria in a 2–2 home draw for the Euro 2008 qualifying phase, on 2 September 2006.

Honours

Club
Steaua
Divizia A: 1993–94, 1994–95, 1995–96, 1996–97, 1997–98
Cupa României: 1995–96, 1996–97, 1998–99
Supercupa României: 1994, 1995, 1998

Recreativo
Segunda División: 2005–06

References

External links

1975 births
Living people
Sportspeople from Iași
Romanian footballers
Association football wingers
Association football forwards
Liga I players
FC Steaua București players
La Liga players
Segunda División players
Segunda División B players
CD Numancia players
Recreativo de Huelva players
Cádiz CF players
Romania international footballers
UEFA Euro 2000 players
Romanian expatriate footballers
Expatriate footballers in Spain
Romanian expatriate sportspeople in Spain
Romanian football managers
FC UTA Arad managers